is a private university in Kiyose, Tokyo, Japan. The predecessor of the school was founded 1902.

External links
 Official website 

Educational institutions established in 1902
Private universities and colleges in Japan
Universities and colleges in Tokyo
Kiyose, Tokyo
1902 establishments in Japan